Agathotoma pseudolabratula is an extinct species of sea snails, a marine gastropod mollusk in the family Mangeliidae.

Description

Distribution
This extinct species was found in Oligocene and Lower Miocene strata of Aquitaine, France.

References

 Lozouet P. (2015). Nouvelles espèces de gastéropodes (Mollusca: Gastropoda) de l'Oligocène et du Miocène inférieur d'Aquitaine (Sud-Ouest de la France). Partie 5. Cossmanniana. 17: 15-84.

pseudolabratula
Gastropods described in 2015
Cenozoic gastropods of Europe